The R303 is a regional route in South Africa that connects Citrusdal with Ceres via the Koue Bokkeveld.

Route
Its northern beginning is at the N7 outside Citrusdal. It initially runs east, and passes through that town, before climbing over the Middelberg Pass and the Buffelshoek Pass. From there, it runs southward through the Koue Bokkeveld to the Gydo Pass, where it descends to Prince Alfred Hamlet and Ceres, where it ends at an intersection with the R46.

References

External links
 

Regional Routes in the Western Cape